The RCD Cup 1967 was the second edition of the RCD Cup tournament, held in Dhaka, East Pakistan, Pakistan in 1967. This was a three nation tournament played in league format between Iran, Pakistan and Turkey.

Venue

Results

Top scorers
2 Goals
 Fevzi Zemzem
 Ergün Acuner

Squads

Iran

Head coach:   Hossein Fekri

Pakistan

Head coach:  Mohammad Amin

Mohammedan SC

Mohammedan SC

Turkey

Head coach:  Adnan Süvari

References
RSSSF Page on RCD Cup tournament
TeamMelli.com page for squad list
NationalFootballTeams
Turkish Football Federation
TURKFUTBOLU

1967
1967
1967
1967 in Asian football
1967–68 in Turkish football
1967 in Pakistani sport